Leopold Heyperger was a 16th-century Viennese burgher who was the Burggrave of Hofburg Palace from 1547 to 1560, as well as Ferdinand I's treasurer. He was personally appointed to be the administrator of the imperial Kunstkammer in Hofburg Palace. He is best known for organizing a vast collection of ancient Roman coins for the Kunstkammer in 1547.

See also 
 The Heyperger Family

Sources 

1504 births
1564 deaths
Austrian nobility
Austrian knights
Hofburg